Manhunt in the City, also known as The Manhunt, is a 1975 Italian poliziottesco film directed by Umberto Lenzi. It was co-written by Dardano Sacchetti and has a score by Bruno Nicolai.

Cast 

 Henry Silva: Davide Vannucchi
 Raymond Pellegrin:Inspector Bertone
 Luciana Paluzzi: Vera Vannucchi
 Silvano Tranquilli: Giordani	
 Claudio Gora: Lawyer Mieli
 Luciano Catenacci: Pascucci

Production
Manhunt in the City was filmed at Elios Film in Rome and on location in Milan. Lenzi originally envisioned Claudio Cassinelli in the role that Silva has. Henry Silva and Luciana Paluzzi are paired again, after their performance together in The Italian Connection (1972).

Style
The film is part of vigilante subgenre. The films script overturns initial assumptions where the engineer Vannucchi get manipulated by a fascist lawyer who heads an army of vigilantes and ends up killing the wrong person. Lenzi stated that he desired to make a film in contrast to Enzo G. Castellari's Street Law. The film also has a few elements of the giallo genre, as Silva's hunt for a criminal who wears a bracelet depicting a scorpion.

Release
Manhunt in the City was released in Italy on 8 May 1975 where it was distributed by Titanus. On its theatrical run in Italy, the film grossed 711.5 million Italian lira. According to Lenzi, "censors found it very annoying that in the end the Commissioner, understanding the protagonist's motives that lead to his revenge, lets him go unpunished."
The film was issued on DVD in Italy in 2010.

See also
 List of Italian films of 1975

Footnotes

References

External links

1975 films
1975 crime films
Italian crime films
1970s Italian-language films
Films directed by Umberto Lenzi
Films scored by Bruno Nicolai
Poliziotteschi films
Titanus films
1970s Italian films